Battle of Los Angeles (2016) was the twelfth Battle of Los Angeles professional wrestling tournament produced by Pro Wrestling Guerrilla (PWG). It was a three-night event which took place on September 2, September 3 and September 4, 2016 at the American Legion Post #308 in Reseda, Los Angeles, California.

The twenty-four man tournament concluded with a three-way elimination match in the final, in which Marty Scurll defeated Trevor Lee and Will Ospreay. Several non-tournament matches took place across three nights. The event featured the PWG debut of Cody Rhodes, John Hennigan, Mark Haskins, Matthew Riddle and Pete Dunne.

The first night was headlined by a six-man tag team match, in which Mount Rushmore 2.0 (Adam Cole and The Young Bucks (Matt Jackson and Nick Jackson)) defeated Bobby Fish, Dalton Castle and Kyle O'Reilly. The second night was headlined by a six-man tag team match, in which Matt Sydal, Ricochet and Will Ospreay defeated Mount Rushmore 2.0 (Adam Cole and The Young Bucks). On the undercard, Fenix and Pentagon Jr. defeated Chris Hero and Tommy End. The third night featured a twelve-man tag team match, along with The Young Bucks defending the World Tag Team Championship against Fenix and Pentagon Jr.

Background
Former WWE stars Cody Rhodes and John Hennigan (the former John Morrison) were announced to make their PWG debuts as participants in the Battle of Los Angeles. Adam Cole was originally announced for the tournament, but he later removed himself stating that he had already won the Battle Los Angeles (once) and had no interest in competing again and was replaced by Cedric Alexander. Jack Gallagher was originally announced for the tournament, but could not make the show due to travel issues and was replaced by Tommaso Ciampa.

Reception
Jake St-Pierre of 411Mania praised the night one of the tournament, rating it 9. He said that it was "one of the better shows in PWG's history to boot". He praised most of the performances with minimal criticism directed at John Hennigan and Matt Sydal's match as "a bit low-key" and the main event six-man tag team match as "a bit corny". He stated that the night two was "one of the best 2 and half hours of wrestling", with praise towards "the mindblowing trios main event", "End & Hero vs. Pentagon and Fenix", Mark Andrews and Pete Dunne's match as "a high-octane cat and mouse match", Matt Riddle and Kyle O'Reilly's and "grappling that would make Akira Maeda shed a tear of joy". He appreciated the diverse wrestling on this show, recommending that "you'll be able to find a style of wrestling you enjoy, and those styles are all represented by the best the wrestling world has to offer."

Andrew of SoCal Uncensored reviewed it as a "good show overall", which "seemed to set the stage for the entire weekend", with specific praise towards a few matches, as "Ospreay/Fenix pretty much killed it andCobb/Ricochet was a great showcase for Cobb". He believed that "Hero/End vs. Pentagon Jr./Fenix was the best match of the" night two. He further stated "The tournament matches were really solid overall, with guys having impressive individual performances. The main event was a fun spot fest. There was a badly botched spot and some spots that looked too telegraphed, but it was a fun sprint. The three standout performers of the show were Ricochet for his performance in the main event, Mark Andrews with another great performance, and Cody Rhodes for being one of the most enthusiastic wrestlers." The first part of the night three "was bordering between averagely boring and pretty good". He praised a few matches on the card by stating "Ricochet and Hennigan had a very fun match, as was Hero and Andrews’ match as well as the post match angle."

Steve Bryant of SoCal Uncensored praised the night one as "a really good show and a great start to the tournament". He said that "commentary on this show was excellent" and "The Fenix/Ospreay and Jeff Cobb/Ricochet matches were really good and worth the purchase of this just for those matches." He said that the night two was "the best single show in SoCal over the last 16 years". He felt that the night three "was another awesome night of wrestling". He said that "Every match in the actual tournament was good." He praised the match between Cody Rhodes and Marty Scurll as "a really great performance". He believed that Young Bucks and the team of Fenix and Pentagon Jr. "were phenominal throughout the weekend", with both teams being part "of tag matches on night 2 that were the two best matches in SoCal this year" and the latter team not showing "a lucha style in the match and really showed their range". He said that the three nights of Battle of Los Angeles were "3 fantastic shows, once again showing why they (PWG) have the best wrestling in the world".

Kevin Pantoja rated the night one 7.0 stating it as "A good way to start the tournament". He said that "Nothing on the show was blow away great or a match of the year contender, but nothing was really bad either." He felt that "Sydal/Hennigan" was skippable and further stated that "Ricochet/Cobb, Liger/Hero and Ospreay/Fenix are all fun, while Scurll/Pentagon was the MOTN". He rated the night two 8.5 as "a consistently strong show", with some criticism towards "the opener, Sami/Cody and main event" while "the Heroes Eventually Die/Pentagon and Fenix tag was the best thing". He gave mixed reviews to night three, considering it "the weakest of the three shows." He rated it 7.0 with nothing "bad but some stuff underwhelmed (O’Reilly/Haskins and the main event)". He praised the "Ospreay/Ricochet, Scurll/Haskins and Hero/Andrews" matches and stated that there were "two great matches in Ospreay/Sabre and the Tag Team Title match".

The six-man tag team match between Mount Rushmore 2.0 and the team of Matt Sydal, Ricochet and Will Ospreay on the second night received unanimous praise from critics, with Dave Meltzer awarding it the prestigious 5-star rating and SoCal Uncensored awarded it the 2016 Southern California Match of the Year Award.

Aftermath
After winning the 2016 Battle of Los Angeles, Marty Scurll received a title shot for the PWG World Championship against Zack Sabre Jr. at Mystery Vortex IV, which he lost.

Results

Tournament brackets

References

External links
Pro Wrestling Guerrilla official website

2016 in professional wrestling
Battle of Los Angeles (professional wrestling)
Professional wrestling in California
Professional wrestling in Los Angeles
September 2016 sports events in the United States
2016 in Los Angeles
2016 in California